'Hey, Killer' is the eighth studio album by American alternative rock duo Local H, released on April 14, 2015 through G&P Records, the official merchandiser for the band. Unlike previous recordings, Hey, Killer is not a conceptual release. The album was released on digital, CD, and vinyl formats. The record marks the first full-length recording to feature Ryan Harding on drums.

Recording for the album was mostly funded by a Pledgemusic campaign started by the band. People who helped donate to the campaign were rewarded with items such as limited edition T-shirts and signed copies of the record. Five percent of the money raised by the campaign was completed was sent to MusiCares, an organization that helps musicians with financial and personal struggles.

Track listing

Personnel

Performers
Scott Lucas - Vocals, guitar
Ryan Harding - Drums

Production
Andy Gerber - Production, recording
Greg Norman - Recording
Phil Anderson Blythe - Artwork, design
Stephen Marcussen - Mastering
Katie Hovland - Photography
John Oakes - Photography

References

External links
 

Local H albums
2015 albums